Víctor Narro Valero (born 27 May 1999) is a Spanish footballer who plays mainly as a right winger for Deportivo La Coruña.

Club career
Narro was born in Palma de Mallorca, Balearic Islands, and represented RCD Mallorca and SD La Salle before joining Villarreal CF's youth setup in January 2017, for a €40,000 fee. On 14 July 2018, after finishing his formation, he was assigned to farm team CD Roda in Tercera División.

Narro made his senior debut on 26 August 2018 by starting in a 2–1 home win over Paterna CF, and scored his first goal on 25 November by netting the opener in a 2–2 away draw against Orihuela CF. After finishing the campaign with three goals in 35 appearances, he returned to the Yellow Submarine and was included in the C-team also in the fourth tier.

Narro spent the 2020–21 season with the reserves in Segunda División B, before departing the club on 31 July 2021. Three days later, he moved to another reserve team, Real Valladolid Promesas in Primera División RFEF on a one-year contract.

Narro made his first team debut on 13 November 2021, coming on as a late substitute for Álvaro Aguado in a 3–0 Segunda División home success over CF Fuenlabrada.

On 24 June 2022, Narro agreed to a two-year contract with Deportivo La Coruña.

References

External links

1999 births
Living people
Footballers from Palma de Mallorca
Spanish footballers
Association football wingers
Segunda División players
Primera Federación players
Segunda División B players
Tercera División players
Villarreal CF C players
Villarreal CF B players
Real Valladolid Promesas players
Real Valladolid players
Deportivo de La Coruña players